Katy Trail may refer to the following places in the United States:

 Katy Trail (Dallas) 3.5 mile trail in Dallas, Texas
 Katy Trail State Park, 240 mile trail across Missouri